The Victory Altar (Korean SeungNiJeDan) is a Christian new religious movement founded in South Korea in 1981. It teaches that Jesus Christ was a false messiah and that the real Christ is its founder, Cho Hee-Seung (1931–2004), “the Victor Christ.” The movement had some 400,000 members in the early 1990s. By 2017, however, membership declined to around 100,000. The decline came after Cho's arrest 1994 and death in 2004.

History

Cho Hee-Seung was born on August 12, 1931, in Gimpo, in the Gyeonggi province of South Korea. As a Christian, he was incarcerated by North Korea during the Korean War; after his liberation, he was active in Methodism and Presbyterianism. Decisive for Cho’s subsequent religious activities was his encounter with Park Tae-Seon (1915–1990), the founder of the Olive Tree (Jundokwan), a Korean Christian new religion that gathered 1.5 million followers in the 1970s before declining in the subsequent decades, and generated through various schism several other Korean religious movements. In the 1960s and 1970s, Cho operated as a successful missionary for the Olive Tree and founded several churches in South Korea.

In 1980, Cho went through a long retreat near Bucheon, South Korea, in one of the Faith Villages of the Olive Tree. Here, in a building known as the “Secret Chamber” (MilSil), he was initiated by Hong Eup-Bi, a woman member of the Olive Tree who was regarded as a “shaman”. The Victory Altar claims that on 15 October 1980, Hong recognized in Cho “the Victor Christ” and “God incarnated”, leading him to leave the Olive Tree and establish his own new religious movement, the Victory Altar (SeungNiJeDan), in Bucheon. The movement grew rapidly; on August 12, 1991, the headquarters in Bucheon were completed. In a few years, the Victory Altar gathered some 400,000 followers, mostly in South Korea, but with branches in Japan, Australia, New Zealand, the United States and the United Kingdom.

By 2017, membership had declined to around 100,000. The decline came after Cho’s arrest in 1994 and death in 2004.

Controversies

Because of his criticism of Jesus Christ and his own messianic claims, Cho encountered the hostility of Korean Christian churches, which promoted media campaigns against the Victory Altar and accused its founder of various wrongdoings. In 1994, Cho was arrested and spent in jail seven of the last ten years of his life. He was accused both of fraud and of having instigated the murder of six ex-members turned militant opponents of the Victory Altar. Cho was convicted for fraud, found not guilty in a first case about the murders in 1996, then found guilty in a second trial in 2004, and sentenced to death, but again found not guilty on appeal. South Korea has three degrees of judgement: the prosecutor appealed the decision favorable to Cho before the Supreme Court, but Cho died just before the trial, on June 19, 2004. The prosecution of Cho and above all his death, since many followers believed him to be physically immortal, were serious blows for the movement, which started a phase of decline, although by 2017 it still maintained 40 Victory Altars in Korea with some 100,000 followers.

Beliefs
According to the Victory Altar, all the great sacred scriptures of humanity, including the Bible, the classics of Buddhism, and the ancient prophetic books of Korea announce the “original promise” of God, i.e. that humans may achieve physical immortality. This is the only real immortality, and the notion that a soul separated from the body will live eternally in Heaven is a false interpretation of the holy scriptures. It was also part of the message of Jesus Christ, thus evidencing that he was a false prophet, and in fact was “the only son of Satan.” Additional evidence that Jesus Christ was not a divine incarnation comes, according to the Victory Altar, from the fact that he was the son of a Roman soldier named Pantera, who might have raped his mother Mary, and that he married Mary Magdalene, widely regarded as a fallen woman. The sources for these accusations are the Roman anti-Christian philosopher Celsus and the book The Holy Blood and the Holy Grail, which also influenced the phenomenally successful 2003 novel The Da Vinci Code by Dan Brown.
Jesus Christ is not part of the succession of divine incarnations and prophets proposed by the Victory Altar. This starts with Adam and Eve, who were divine and immortal and formed the original Trinity with God. Not being omnipotent, however, God could not prevent Satan from capturing Adam and Eve and depriving them of their immortality. 6,000 years, and a succession of divine prophets, were needed before God could overcome Satan and offer again physical immortality to humans. A first set of prophets includes Noah, Abraham, Isaac, Jacob, and Dan. The latter was the legitimate successor of Jacob (as proved, the Victory Altar maintains, by the Biblical Book of Genesis, 49:16) and eventually his tribe, the Danites, migrated to Korea, whose mythical first king was called Dangun, or King Dan. Korea hosted the second set of prophets, including the founder of the Olive Tree, Park Tae-Seon, the woman who initiated Cho, Hong Eup-Bi, and Cho himself, as well as the founders of two other Korean new religions, Choe Je-u of Donghak and Gang Il-Sun of Jeungsanism.

The crucial role, in the sacred history of humanity as narrated by the Victory Altar, belongs to Cho himself, which through his initiation of 1980 overcame the “blood of Satan,” which is still present in all humans and is identified with the ego, and became “the Victor Christ," i.e. a divine incarnation through which God came to Earth, defeated Satan, and finally restored physical immortality for humans. In fact, Cho was the first Human after Adam who became physically immortal. Although he had to depose (or, rather, transform) his body because of the malice of his opponents, the movement believes that he is still physically present and guides the religious services of the Victory Altar, where his image is projected through videos. Services are held daily, and five yearly feasts are also celebrated: the Victory Day (October 15), Cho’s Birthday, which is called Christmas (August 12), Messiah Day (December 25), Holy Dew Spirit Day (January 1), and Parent Day (May 8).

The “Holy Dew,” also called in the movement “Hidden Manna,” is a smoke, fog, or fire that, the movement claims emanated from Cho’s body and portraits during his lifetime and continues to emanate from his photographs today. The Victory Altar insists that the Holy Dew is real and can be captured by cameras. It serves both as evidence of Cho’s divinity and as spiritual nourishment for his followers. According to the Victory Altar, Cho also proved his divine status by complying with the “five covenants” he had promised to his followers: the destruction of world Communism; the stopping of typhoons coming to South Korea; making harvests in Korea abundant; stopping the rainy seasons (June 15-July 15) there; preventing a new Korean war and unifying the two Koreas. The latter covenant, the movement believes, is in the process of being realized, and at any rate Cho has miraculously stopped both the return of Communism to Russia and North Korea's aggression plans against South Korea.

The main promise of Cho, however, is that at least some humans may recover physical immortality. To this aim, belief in Cho is not sufficient, and the Victory Altar teaches that pretending that mere belief can save is just another of the misconceptions propagated by Jesus Christ. Only those who fully practice the "Law of Liberty,” by overcoming their ego and identifying with fellow human beings as one, may one day cleanse their blood from Satan’s heritage and become physically immortal. As old members age and die, insisting on physical immortality becomes difficult, which has been suggested as another explanation of the movement’s decline. Many, however, still maintain the hope and proclaim that at least some of them will never die.

References

Citations

Sources
Han, Gang-Hyen (2016). “The Essence of the Maitreya Buddha & The Hidden Mandarava in Pure Land: Focus on the Perspective of Prophecies in the Sacred Sutra.” Journal of International Academy of Neohumans Culture 4:29-202.
Han, Gang-Hyen (2017). “The Hidden History of the Lost Dan Tribe and the Secrets of New Jerusalem.” Journal of the International Academy of Neohumans Culture 5:37-73.
Headquarters of SeungNiJeDan (2017). The SeungNiJeDan: The Immortal Science. A New Theo-Science Beyond Religion. Bucheon: Headquarters of SeungNiJeDan, Department of International Affairs & Academy.
Holland, Clifton L., with Linda J. Holland (2014). PROLADES Encyclopedia of Religion in Latin America & the Caribbean. I. A Classification System of Religious Groups in America by Major Traditions and Family Tipes. 2nd edition [first edition: 1993]. San Pedro (Costa Rica): PROLADES. 
Introvigne, Massimo (2017). "Victory Altar". World Religions and Spiritualities Project, Virginia Commonwealth University. Accessed November 8, 2017.
Kwon, Hee-Soon (1992). The Science of Immortality. Seoul: Hae-In Publishing.
Kim, Young-Suk. (2013). The Hidden Secret of the Bible. Bucheon: GeumSeong. 
Lee, Dong-Chul. (2000). Bright Star. Seoul: Hae-In Publishing.
Victory Altar (2008-2009). "A brief history of St. Cho, HeeSeung". Accessed November 8, 2017.

External links

Official Website (Korean)

Christian new religious movements
Cults
Religious organizations based in South Korea
Christian organizations established in 1981
1981 establishments in South Korea
Self-declared messiahs